Brian O'Connor may refer to:

Brian O'Connor (baseball coach) (born 1971), head coach of the University of Virginia baseball team
Brian O'Connor (bassist), bassist for rock band Eagles of Death Metal
Brian O'Connor (cricketer) (1913–1963), Queensland opening bowler of the 1930s
Brian O'Connor (philosopher), Irish social philosopher 
Brian O'Connor (pitcher) (born 1977), former Major League Baseball pitcher for the Pittsburgh Pirates
Brian O'Connor (actor) (born 1953), actor/comedian who played Schemer on Shining Time Station
Brian O'Connor (artist) (born 1958), American visual artist

See also
Bryan D. O'Connor (born 1946), astronaut
Brian Connor (disambiguation)
Brian O'Conner, a fictional character from The Fast and the Furious film series